By the North Gate is a collection of short stories by Joyce Carol Oates. It was the author's first book, first published by Vanguard Press in 1963.

It was last published in 1971 by Fawcett. Two stories in the collection, "Edge of the World" and "The Fine White Mist of Winter", were later collected in her book Where are you Going, Where have you Been?: Selected Early Stories (1993).

Most of the tales are set in a fictitious "Eden County" and depict rather rural scenes and characters, contrary to her later volumes, which are mostly set in an urban environment. Margaret Groppi Rozga sums up the characteristics of this volume as follows:The initial stories in By the North Gate portray a series of losses that define the condition of the contemporary world as Oates sees it. The Eden County in which several of them are set is hardly an echo of the paradise it might once have been. It is a world which values only material goods and whose characters set store not by their own consciences but by what they perceive to be the opinion of their fellows. Any deeper consciousness, and any sense of perspective on the present, is fractured, if it continues to exist at all. Consequently the quality of love, friendship, community, any unifying element, is also diminished. And it is such erosion and its alienating effects on the characters that the other stories in this volume show.

Stories 

 "Swamps"
 "By the North Gate"
 "The Census Taker"
 "Ceremonies"
 "The Expense of Spirit"
 "Images"
 "Pastoral Blood"
 "Boys at a Picnic"
 "Edge of the World"
 "An Encounter with the Blind"
 "The Fine White Mist of Winter"
 "A Legacy"
 "Sweet Love Remembered"
 "In the Old World"
Source:

References

1963 short story collections
Short story collections by Joyce Carol Oates
Vanguard Press books